John Elbert Sater (January 16, 1854 – July 18, 1937) was a United States district judge of the United States District Court for the Southern District of Ohio.

Education and career

Born in New Haven, Ohio, Sater received an Artium Baccalaureus degree from Marietta College in 1875 and an Artium Magister degree from the same institution in 1878, before reading law to enter the bar in 1884. He was the Superintendent of Schools of Wauseon, Ohio from 1875 to 1881, also serving as a county school examiner for that jurisdiction. He was the chief clerk of the Office of State Commissioner of Common Schools from 1881 to 1884, and a member of the Board of Education in Columbus, Ohio from 1885 to 1890, serving as its President from 1888 to 1889.

Federal judicial service

Sater received a recess appointment from President Theodore Roosevelt on March 18, 1907, to the United States District Court for the Southern District of Ohio, to a new seat authorized by 34 Stat. 928. He was nominated to the same position by President Roosevelt on December 3, 1907. His service terminated on May 30, 1908, after his nomination was not confirmed by the United States Senate, which never held a vote. Sater received a second recess appointment from President Roosevelt on May 30, 1908, to the same position. He was nominated to the same position by President Roosevelt on December 8, 1908. He was confirmed by the Senate on March 1, 1909, and received his commission the same day. His service terminated on November 18, 1924, due to his retirement.

Note

References

Sources
 

1854 births
1937 deaths
Judges of the United States District Court for the Southern District of Ohio
United States district court judges appointed by Theodore Roosevelt
20th-century American judges
United States federal judges admitted to the practice of law by reading law